Grainville-Langannerie is a commune in the Calvados department in the Normandy region in northwestern France.

Population

Sights
The town contains a cemetery of Polish soldiers killed in the Battle of Hill 262 during World War II.

See also
Grainville-sur-Odon
Communes of the Calvados department

References

Communes of Calvados (department)
Calvados communes articles needing translation from French Wikipedia